Vietnamese National Football First League (V.League 2) is the second highest league in Vietnamese football after the V.League 1 with 14 teams competing in it.

Previous Winners

Standings

Second level Vietnamese football league seasons
2
Viet
Viet

vi:Giải bóng đá vô địch quốc gia Việt Nam 2009